The R-5 Human Rhythm Composer is an electronic drum machine introduced in 1989 by Roland Corporation, using PCM voices. The R-5 features velocity- and pressure-sensitive trigger pads, and the ability to create loops of beats. The pads are assignable and can be user defined for different sounds and also for different amplitude and semi-tones within each sample.

The R-5 is the smaller brother of the Roland R-8 which had more sounds and features than the R-5

Sounds
It featured 68 internal voices such as: Electronic Kick, Jazz Snare, Rimshot , Electronic Snare, Brush Roll Snare, Electronic Toms, Timbale, Bongo, and Slap Bass.

Notable Users 
Autechre
Orbital
Underworld
808 State
Human League

References

Drum machines
R-5
R-5
Musical instruments invented in the 1980s
Japanese inventions